Various people of the Caucasus or Caucasian peoples live in Turkey today. They include:

 Immigrants from North Caucasus due to the Caucasian War of the 19th century:
 Circassians: Following the end of Circassian insurgency in 1864 and as an exodus from North Caucasia, Circassian people had settled in the territory of Turkey. Circassian population in Turkey is concentrated on two belts of habitation; first one from the province of Samsun to Hatay, the second from Düzce to Çanakkale, especially in Balıkesir. See also; Circassians in Turkey
 Dagestani people: They live in villages in the provinces like Balıkesir, Malatya, Tokat, Yalova and also scattered in other parts of the country. Majority among them are Avars, Lezgins are the second significant ethnic group. Kumyks are also present.
 Nakh people: Chechens  live in the provinces Kahramanmaraş, Mardin, Sivas and Muş.
 Ossetians: This ethnic group is found in provinces Kars and Yozgat.
 Karachay: They live in villages concentrated in Konya and Eskişehir.

 Autochthonous people of Transcaucasia:
 Kartvelians:
 Georgians: Muslim Georgians form the majority in parts of Artvin Province east of the Çoruh River. Immigrant groups of Georgian origins, found scattered in Turkey are known as Chveneburi.
 Laz: They are found in the territory of former Lazistan sanjak and also in Düzce, Sakarya, Kocaeli, Bartın.
 Azerbaijanis (See also; Azerbaijanis in Turkey)
 Pontic Greeks
 Caucasus Greeks: consisting mainly of Greeks from the former Russian Caucasus province of Kars Oblast and Turkish speaking Christian Greeks from Georgia and northeastern Anatolia, also known as Urums.
 Armenians (Armenians in Turkey).

Caucasian refugees 
The Ottoman and Russian empires fought at least 17 wars between 1568 and 1917. The Ottomans lost vast and often solidly Turkish and Muslim territories, spanning from the Crimea to Circassia, to the Russians. The Russians killed many inhabitants of these Ottoman lands and expelled the rest to Turkey. So many Turks descend from refugees from Russia that the adage in Turkey is: "If you scratch a Turk, you find a Circassian persecuted by Russians underneath."

See also
 Peoples of the Caucasus in Iran

External links 
Ethnic Groups in the Republic of Turkey, Peter Alford Andrews, Wiesbaden, 1989; 
 Kafkas Ekipleri Başkan Koçal’ı Ziyaret Ettiler

References

Caucasus diasporas
Ethnic groups in Turkey
Peoples of the Caucasus